The Al Cohn Quintet Featuring Bobby Brookmeyer is an album by saxophonist, composer and arranger Al Cohn's Quintet with trombonist Bob Brookmeyer recorded in late 1956 for the Coral label.

Reception

The Allmusic review by Ken Dryden stated "Cohn and Brookmeyer inspire one another throughout the sessions".

Track listing
All compositions by Al Cohn except as indicated
 "The Lady Is a Tramp" (Richard Rodgers, Lorenz Hart) - 3:25
 "Good Spirits" (Bob Brookmeyer) - 3:37
 "A Blues Serenade" (Frank Signorelli, Vincent Grande, Jimmy Lytell) - 4:23
 "Lazy Man Stomp" (Brookmeyer) - 2:56
 "Ill Wind (You're Blowin' Me No Good)" (Harold Arlen, Ted Koehler) - 2:50
 "Chlo-e (Song of the Swamp)" (Neil Moret, Gus Kahn) - 3:38
 "S-H-I-N-E" (Cecil Mack, Lew Brown, Ford Dabney) - 3:45
 "Back to Back" - 2:37
 "So Far So Good" - 3:50
 "Winter" - 3:54
 "I Should Care" (Axel Stordahl, Paul Weston, Sammy Cahn) - 2:41
 "Bunny Hunch" (Brookmeyer) - 2:39

Personnel 
Al Cohn - tenor saxophone
Bob Brookmeyer - valve trombone
Mose Allison - piano
Teddy Kotick - bass
Nick Stabulas - drums

References 

1957 albums
Coral Records albums
Al Cohn albums
Bob Brookmeyer albums